Rachel Yurkovich (born October 10, 1986) is an American javelin thrower. She competed at the 2012 Summer Olympics in London.

Yurkovich graduated from Newberg High School in Newberg, Oregon in 2005. She graduated from the University of Oregon in 2009. She was the NCAA women’s javelin champion in both 2008 and 2009. She placed 11th in the finals of the javelin throw at the 2009 World Championships in Athletics.

Yurkovich placed third at the 2008 U.S. Olympic trials, but failed to qualify for the Games because she had not achieved the Olympic A standard. The situation was reversed in 2012. Yurkovich place fourth in the 2012 U.S. Olympic trials with a distance of 56.85 meters, but qualified because she had previously achieved the Olympic A standard while third-place finisher Kimberley Hamilton had not. Yurkovich had exceeded the A standard by three inches at an April meet in France. At the 2012 Olympics, Yurkovich's best throw during the qualifying round was 57.92 meters. She placed 13th in her group (24th overall) and did not qualify for the final. Yurkovich made an error in her steps on the first throw, committed a foot fault on the second throw, and achieved her best distance on her third throw.

Personal life
Yurkovich is married to a former Danish pole vaulter, Piotr Buciarski, who also competed for the University of Oregon. She and Piotr have two children together, Maya and Maksymilian.

References

External links

Verified Twitter account for Rachel Yurkovich
 IAAF profile for Rachel Yurkovic
 USATF profile for Rachel Yurkovich

1986 births
Living people
American female javelin throwers
Olympic track and field athletes of the United States
Athletes (track and field) at the 2012 Summer Olympics
People from Newberg, Oregon
Oregon Ducks women's track and field athletes